is a Japanese former professional boxer who competed from 2011 to 2019 and a kickboxer. He began competing again as a professional kickboxer in 2021.

He is the former K-1 Heavyweight Champion and successfully defended the title against kickboxing legend Peter Aerts at K-1 World Grand Prix 2010 in Yokohama. He was also the K-1 World Grand Prix 2008 in Fukuoka tournament finalist and K-1 Young Japan GP 2007 champion.

Early life
Fujimoto was born in Osaka, Japan on June 23, 1986. He started learning karate of Uomoto-ryū (魚本流) as a child. His parents divorced in 1997 and he lived with his mother, sisters and grandmother.

Kickboxing career
Kyotaro moved to Tokyo and joined Dragon Dojo established by Kensaku Maeda. He debuted on May 17, 2006 against Junichi Hanada.

Kyotaro entered the world of K-1 when he fought and won the K-1 Tryout 2007 Survival tournament in Tokyo by defeating Tatsunori Momose in the semi-final and Takumi Sato in the final, all by decision. This tournament was designed to showcase new talent. He then fought Kyoung Suk Kim during the opening fights at K-1 World Grand Prix 2007 in Seoul Final 16 defeating Kim by 2nd Round Knockout. 

He further proved himself as a top K-1 contender by defeating the K-1 World Grand Prix 2004 in Las Vegas II and the K-1 World Grand Prix 2007 in Hawaii tournament champion Mighty Mo at K-1 World Grand Prix 2008 in Yokohama. Kyotaro was then invited to fight in the K-1 World GP 2008 in Fukuoka in which he became the runner up losing to Brazilian Karateka Ewerton Teixeira.

On March 28, 2009, Kyotaro won the K-1 Heavyweight (-100 kg) Title tournament by knocking out Melvin Manhoef in semifinals and beating Gokhan Saki in finals by extra round majority decision. Kyotaro became the second fighter after Badr Hari to win the title in K-1 Light Heavyweight division.

On December 5, 2009, he faced Tyrone Spong at the K-1 World Grand Prix 2009 Final and lost by unanimous decision.

Kyotaro defended his title against 3 time K-1 Grand Prix Champion Peter Aerts at K-1 World Grand Prix 2010 in Yokohama. Kyotaro knocked Aerts down twice at the end of the 1st Round and then knocked him out with his right hook in the 2nd Round.

At the K-1 Final 16 Kyotaro defeated another legend in Jerome Le Banner. Kyotaro withstood the Frenchman's early power to give him a severe beating in the 3rd round to earn a draw.  Le Banner was angry at the decision and walked out of the ring, giving Kyotaro the win by DQ.

His next fight was at the K-1 World Grand Prix 2010 Final against 4-time defending champion Semmy Schilt. He was unable to faze his taller opponent, losing by unanimous decision.

He then chose to fight the DREAM (MMA) Light-heavyweight champion Gegard Mousasi. He was knocked down in the second round and again lost by unanimous decision.

In October 2011, Kyotaro relinquished the K-1 Heavyweight title in order to pursue a career in professional boxing.

Return to K-1
In late 2020, Kyotaro announced he would be returning to kickboxing and is expected to compete at K’Festa 4 on January 24, 2021. He was scheduled to fight Kosuke Jitsutaka. The event was later rescheduled for March 31, 2021. He won his fight against Kosuke Jitsutaka by a second-round knockout.

Kyotaro was scheduled to face the K-1 Cruiserweight champion Sina Karimian at K-1 World GP 2021: Yokohamatsuri on September 20, 2021. Kyotaro lost the fight by split decision, after an extra round was fought.

Kyotaro was scheduled to face the J-Network heavyweight champion Hidenori Sakamoto at K-1 World GP 2022 Japan on February 27, 2022. Their fight was later postponed for K-1: K'Festa 5 on April 3, 2022, and was rescheduled as the quarterfinal bout of the 2022 K-1 openweight tournament. He won the fight by a second-round technical knockout and advanced to the tournament semifinals, where he faced Hisaki Kato. Sattari won the fight by majority decision, with scores of 29–29, 30–28 and 30–28.

Kyotaro faced the unbeaten Satoshi Ishii in a super heavyweight bout at K-1 World GP 2023: K'Festa 6 on March 12, 2023. He won the fight by unanimous decision, with two scorecards of 30–29 and one scorecard of 30–27.

Boxing career
Kyotaro debuted as a pro boxer on December 31, 2011 when he took a unanimous decision win over Michael O'Donnell in Osaka, Japan. In September 2012, he defeated Chauncy Welliver by unanimous decision, who at the time was ranked #15 in the world by the WBC. 

Kyotaro took Welliver's place in the WBC top 15 as a result of this win.  Kyotaro lost his next fight against Solomon Haumono via TKO in the 5th round.  The fight was held at Bodymaker Colosseum in Osaka on December 31, 2012. Kyotaro won his first major regional title against Willie Nasio for the vacant WBC - OPBF heavyweight title in 2017.

Kyotaro retired from professional boxing on November 12th, 2020, announcing plans to go into mixed martial arts.

Kickboxing titles
Amateur
18th All Japan Shin-Karate Championships(K-2 GRAND PRIX) Heavyweight(+75 kg) tournament winner (May 3, 2007)
Professional
2009-2011 K-1 Heavyweight (-100 kg) Champion (1 def.)
2009 K-1 Heavyweight (-100 kg) Tournament Champion
2008 K-1 Japan GP in Fukuoka Runner-up
2007 K-1 Tryouts Young Japan GP champion

Boxing titles
Japanese heavyweight title (224½Ibs)
WBC - OPBF heavyweight title (227¼Ibs)
WBO Asia Pacific heavyweight title (228½Ibs)

Awards
18th All Japan Shin-Karate Championship Gaora Award

Ring names
Kyōtarō Ranger (狂太郎レンジャー / May 2006 - August 2007)
Kyōtarō Ranger (強太郎レンジャー / August 2007 - January 2008)
Maeda Keijirō (前田 慶次郎 / January 2008 - August 2009) a.k.a. Keijiro Maeda
Kyōtarō (京太郎 / August 2009 – December 2010)
Kyotaro Fujimoto (藤本 京太郎 / December 2011–Present)

Kickboxing record

Professional boxing record

References

External links 

Japanese male kickboxers
Heavyweight kickboxers
Heavyweight boxers
Japanese male karateka
Sportspeople from Osaka
Living people
1986 births
Japanese male boxers